The Class Z Reserve was a Reserve contingent of the British Army consisting of previously enlisted soldiers, now discharged.

The first  Z Reserve was authorised by an Army Order of 3 December 1918.  When expected problems with violations of the Armistice with Germany did not eventuate, the Z Reserve was abolished on 31 March 1920.

Following the Second World War, a new Z Reserve of soldiers and officers who had served between 3 September 1939 and 31 December 1948 were available for recall if under 45 years of age.

References

Military units and formations of the British Army
History of the British Army